Platycorynus azureus is a species of leaf beetle distributed from Senegal to the Democratic Republic of the Congo, Uganda and South Sudan. described by Johan Reinhold Sahlberg in 1829.

References

Eumolpinae
Beetles of Africa
Beetles of the Democratic Republic of the Congo
Insects of West Africa
Insects of the Republic of the Congo
Insects of Uganda
Insects of Sudan
Taxa named by Johan Reinhold Sahlberg
Beetles described in 1829